Spinibarbus sinensis is a species of cyprinid of the subfamily Spinibarbinae. It inhabits China and is considered harmless to humans. It grows to  total length. It has not been classified on the IUCN Red List.

References

sinensis
Cyprinid fish of Asia
Freshwater fish of China
Endemic fauna of China
Fish described in 1871
Taxa named by Pieter Bleeker